Mandabi (French: Le Mandat, "The Money Order") is a 1968 film written and directed by Senegalese filmmaker Ousmane Sembène. The film is based on Sembène's novel The Money-Order and is the director's first film in his native Wolof language. Since most of the Senegalese population do not understand French, Sembène wanted to create cinema for Wolof speakers. This is believed to be the first full-length African language film from West Africa.

Plot
An unemployed Senegalese Muslim, Ibrahima Dieng, lives with his two wives and seven children in Dakar. His nephew, Abdou, sends him a money order from Paris worth 25,000 francs, which he has saved from working as a street sweeper. Ibrahima is to keep some of the money for himself, save a portion for his nephew, and give a portion to his sister.

However, Ibrahima faces numerous difficulties trying to obtain the money order. Not having an ID, Ibrahima must go through several levels of Senegalese bureaucracy to try to get one, only to fail after spending money he does not have. Meanwhile, neighbors come over asking for money and Ibrahima is further indebted. In the end, he is swindled by Mbaye, his unscrupulous nephew, who promised to cash the money order for him. Mbaye sells Ibrahima's house to a French man and steals the money order, saying that he was pickpocketed. The film leaves Ibrahima in debt and without a home. The film explores themes of neocolonialism, religion, corruption, and relationships in Senegalese society.

Remastered print 
After the film had not been accessible to cinema audiences for years, it was remastered in 4K resolution and presented at the 2019 Lumière Festival in Lyon, France. In June 2021, this remastered version was  shown in cinemas in the United Kingdom.

Accolades

29th Venice International Film Festival 1968: Special Jury Prize
Soviet Directors Prize from the 1968 Tashkent Film Festival of African and Asian Cinema

See also
Cinema of Senegal

References

External links

Mandabi: Paper Trail an essay by Tiana Reid at the Criterion Collection

1968 films
1968 drama films
Films directed by Ousmane Sembène
Films set in Senegal
1960s French-language films
Senegalese drama films
Wolof-language films
French multilingual films
1960s multilingual films